Everway is a fantasy role-playing game  first published by Wizards of the Coast under their Alter Ego brand in 1995. Its lead designer was Jonathan Tweet. Marketed as a "Visionary Roleplaying Game", it has often been characterized as an innovative piece with a limited commercial success. Wizards later abandoned the line, and Rubicon Games purchased it, and published several supplements. The line was sold again to Gaslight Press in February 2001. The line is currently with The Everway Company, which is working on both a Silver Anniversary Edition and 2nd Edition. 

The game has a fantasy setting of the multiverse type, with many different worlds, some of which differed from generic fantasy. It appears to have been heavily influenced by divinatory tarot, the four classical elements of ancient Greece, and mythologies from around the world.

Everway was first with implementing, in a commercial game, several new concepts including much more picture-based/visual source material and character creation than usual. Like other works by Jonathan Tweet, the rules are very simple and flexible. It is also one of a few diceless role-playing games.  The Fortune Deck works as a randomizer and inspirational tool, and the results obtained by it are highly subjective. In order to clarify their use, Tweet coined some new vocabulary to describe and formalize methods of gamemaster adjudication; these terms have been adopted by the wider tabletop RPG community. Tweet's adjudication terms are: Karma (making a decision based on character abilities, tactics, and the internal logic of a fictional situation), Drama (making a decision based on what moves the story along), and Fortune (letting a randomizer — drawing a card in Everway, but could also refer to rolling dice in other games — determine the outcome).

Description
Everway was a boxed set designed by Jonathan Tweet, Jenny Scott, Aron Anderson, Scott Hungerford, Kathy Ice, Bob Kruger, and John Tynes, with illustrations by Doug Alexander, Rick Berry, Daniel Gelon, Janine Johnston, Hannibal King, Scott Kirschner, Ed Lee, John Matson, Martin McKenna, Ian Miller, Jeff Miracola, Roger Raupp, Andrew Robinson, Christopher Rush, and Amy Weber, and cover art by Susan Harris

The components included:
 162-page Playing Guide
 64-page Gamemastering Guide
 14-page Guide to the Fortune Deck
 90 Vision cards (each depicts a fantastic scene of some sort and is backed with a series of leading questions such as, "What does this person most enjoy?" or "What's the worst thing that could happen in this situation?")
 36 Fortune cards (used for "divination" and action resolution, illustrated by Scott Kirschner and Jeff Miracola)
 four source cards
 six Questy cards
 24 full-colour character sheets
 16" x 11" Bonekeep map and 8" x 11" city map
 plastic trays to hold cards
 box

Setting 
The official setting for Everway revolves around heroes with the power of "spherewalking," traveling between worlds called "spheres." Spheres typically consist of many "realms." The city of Everway is located in a realm called Roundwander, in the sphere called Fourcorner. Roundwander is the only realm in Fourcorner that is described. There is some detail on the sphere's main city, Everway, which contains a stone pyramid, a set of family-oriented guilds, and various exotic events related to the city's position as an inter-dimensional trading center. Several dozen other spheres are described as one-sentence blurbs, a few as page-long summaries, and one in detail as the setting for a sample adventure, "Journey to Stonekeep." The theme is strongly fantasy-oriented as opposed to science fictional, with advanced technology explicitly forbidden in the character creation rules. The authors gave significant thought to anthropology by describing how the people of various spheres live, including many similarities across cultures. Some of these common features are entirely realistic (language, art), and others plainly related to the game's fantasy elements (magic, knowledge of the Fortune Deck). Nearly all spheres are inhabited by humans, with mostly realistic physics.

Character creation 
Character design is abstract and simple by most role-playing games' standards. Each character begins with twenty points to divide between four Element scores roughly equivalent to statistics for Strength (Fire), Perception (Water), Intelligence (Air) and Endurance (Earth). Scores range from 1 (pathetic) to 3 (average) to 10 (godlike), so a generic hero would have scores of 5. Each Element also has a specialty for which a character can get a 1-point bonus; e.g., a 5-Air hero with an Air specialty of "Writing" could write as though their Air score were 6. As a general rule a statistic of N is twice as capable as a level of N-1, where this makes sense. (A 5-Fire, 5-Earth hero can typically defeat two 4-Fire, 5-Earth enemies, or handily defeat a 3-Fire, 5-Earth character in foot race, but cannot necessarily run twice as fast even though speed is governed by Fire.)

Each character also has Powers representing unusual abilities. These cost from 0 to 3 or more points depending on whether they should be considered Frequent, Major (or even "Twice Major", for especially powerful abilities that significantly affect gameplay) and/or Versatile. For instance, a "Cat Familiar," a slightly intelligent cat, is arguably worth 2 points for being Frequent (usually around and often useful) and Versatile (able to scout, carry messages, and fight). A "Winning Smile" that makes the hero likable is worth 0 points because of its trivial effect, while a "Charming Song" that inspires one emotion when played might be useful enough to count as Frequent (1 point). There is no strict rule for deciding what a Power is worth. Each hero can have one 0-point Power for free; additional Powers that would otherwise cost 0 points instead cost 1.

Magic is also abstract. A hero wanting access to magic, as opposed to a few specific Powers, must design their own magic system. This is done by choosing an Element for its basis, which affects its theme; e.g., Air is associated with speech and intellect and would be suitable for a system of spoken spells gained through study. The new Magic statistic has a 1–10 rating and point cost, and can be no higher than the Element on what it is based. The game's rules suggest listing examples of what the magic system can do at each power level, working these out with the GM. It is suggested that most characters do not need magic and that it is not suitable for new players.

Finally, each hero has personality traits based on the game's Fortune and Vision cards. Players are to choose one or more Vision cards and base a backstory on them, and to have three Fortune cards representing a Virtue, Fault, and Fate (a challenge they will face). These three cards can change to represent new phases in the hero's life. There is a list of suggested Motives for why the hero is adventuring, such as "Adversity" or "Wanderlust", but this feature has no gameplay effect.

Equipment such as weaponry is handled completely abstractly, with no specific rules for item cost, carrying capacity, or combat statistics. However, a particularly powerful piece of equipment—for example, a cloak that renders its wearer invisible for a brief period—may be treated as a Power that the hero must spend their initial element points on.

The Fortune Deck 
To decide what happens, the GM considers the rules of Karma (characters' abilities, tactics, logic), Drama (the needs of the plot), and Fortune, the result of a card drawn from the Fortune Deck. Many of these cards are based on the "Major Arcana" of tarot divination, such as "The Fool" and "Death", but the deck includes original cards such as "Drowning in Armor" and "Law." As with the Tarot deck there is symbolic art and each card has two complementary meanings when upright or reversed (while face up). The meanings are printed on the cards (e.g., "Protective Measures Turn Dangerous" vs. "True Prudence" for "Drowning in Armor") and explained more fully in the game's books. The rules are flexible about how often the GM should consult the Fortune Deck, whether the cards should be shown to players, and how much influence the draw should have—it is entirely acceptable for the GM to never use the deck at all, if she so desires. Though cards sometimes have obvious interpretations for the context in which they are drawn, the rules explain that sometimes they are best read simply as "a positive (or negative) result."

Although the Fortune Deck resembles (and can be used as) a fortune-telling device, Everway treats the Deck only as a storytelling device and an element of the fictional setting. It does not in any way endorse "real" fortune-telling or other supernatural concepts.

Reception
In the December 1995 edition of Dragon (Issue 224), Rick Swan was surprised by Wizards of the Coast's choice of the very different Everway to enter the role-playing game market: "Everway is so far out of the mainstream, it’s barely recognizable as an RPG. For starters, it has no dice. It has no tables or charts. A deck of cards directs the flow of the game. Monster bashing, treasure hunting, dungeon crawling—bye-bye; Everway is pure narrative." Swan liked the "first class" production values of the components, but found the maps "lifeless". Swan was a big fan of the diceless system, saying, "It makes for a brisk game, and Everway, to its credit, plays at blinding speed." But Swan was concerned by the how the game placed an unreasonable onus on the improvisational skills of both the gamemaster and the players. He concluded by giving the game an average rating of 4 out of 6.

Reviews
Shadis #25 (March, 1996)
Pyramid #17 (Jan./Feb., 1996)
Games # 132 (Vol 20, #2)	1996	April

References

External links 
 The Everway Company Website
 Official Facebook Page
 EverWiki
 Everweb (large resource collection)

Fantasy role-playing games
Wizards of the Coast games
Jonathan Tweet games
Role-playing games introduced in 1995
Fantasy campaign settings